Terens Owang Priska Puhiri (born 13 October 1996) is an Indonesian professional footballer who plays as a winger for Liga 1 club Borneo and the Indonesia national team. Sometimes referred to as the next Boaz Solossa, he attained minor stardom after footage of him sprinting in a football game went viral, hailed by several news outlets as a candidate for the fastest football player in the world.

Club career

Early career
Prior to becoming a professional player, Puhiri started his career at SSB Numbay Star Papua, and succeeded in bringing SSB Numbay Star to the Papua Regionals of the Danone Cup in 2008. As a result of this achievement, his team was selected to represent the Papua Region in the Danone Cup National stage, held in Jakarta, but were beaten in the semifinals by the team representing the Central Java region.  Puhiri was awarded the best player award and top scorer in the event.

Borneo FC
In 2015, Puhiri joined Borneo FC, signing a five-year contract. On October 23, his goal against Mitra Kukar F.C. matchday 31 of 2017 Liga 1 gained global attention due to the incredibly high speeds at which he appears to run in the video.

Loan to Port FC
On December 20, 2017,  to Thai League 1 club Port for a one-year loan. Terens made his club debut in a pre-season 2018 Leo Cup against Chiangrai United on 9 January 2018. Terens made his first Thai League 1 appearance on 11 February 2018, coming on as a substitute in a 3–0 win with Pattaya United at the PAT Stadium, Bangkok.

International career
In August 2011, Terens was called up to the Indonesia U16 for 2012 AFC U-16 Championship qualification in Thailand. On 12 September 2011, he debuted in a youth national team when he coming as a starting in a 4–1 win against Myanmar U16 in the 2012 AFC U-16 Championship qualification. He also scored his first goal in 8th minute.

In January 2022, Terens was called up to the senior team in a friendly match in Bali by Shin Tae-yong. He earned his first cap in a 4–1 win friendly match against Timor Leste on 27 January 2022. He scored his debut goal, a few days later in the second match against Timor Leste again, in a 3–0 win.

In June 2022, he was called up for 2023 AFC Asian Cup qualification in Kuwait.

Career statistics

Club

International

International goals

Honours

Club
Borneo FC
 President's Cup runner-up: 2017

Individual
 Liga 1 Team of the Season: 2019 (substitutes)

References

External links 

 

1996 births
Living people
Papuan people
Indonesian footballers
Indonesia youth international footballers
Indonesia international footballers
Borneo F.C. players
Liga 1 (Indonesia) players
Indonesian expatriate footballers
Indonesian expatriate sportspeople in Thailand
Expatriate footballers in Thailand
Terens Puhiri
Terens Puhiri
People from Jayapura
Association football wingers
Sportspeople from Papua